Barkåker is a village in the municipality of Tønsberg, Norway. Its population is 1,374.

References

Tønsberg
Villages in Vestfold og Telemark